Vertinskaya, Верти́нская is a female form of Russian surname Vertinsky. Notable people with the surname include:

Lidiya Vertinskaya (1923–2013), Soviet and Russian actress and artist
Anastasiya Vertinskaya, Soviet and Russian actress

See also
Aleksandr Vertinsky